Pagurus is a genus of hermit crabs in the family Paguridae. Like other hermit crabs, their abdomen is not calcified and they use snail shells as protection. These marine decapod crustaceans are omnivorous, but mostly prey on small animals and scavenge carrion. Trigonocheirus and Pagurixus used to be considered subgenera of Pagurus, but the former is nowadays included in Orthopagurus, while the latter has been separated as a distinct genus.

Species
Some 170 species are presently placed in Pagurus; many others have been placed here at one time but are now assigned to other genera of Paguroidea. The following list is current :

Pagurus acadianus Benedict, 1901
Pagurus alabamensis Rathbun, 1935 †
Pagurus alaini Komai, 1998
Pagurus alatus Fabricius, 1775
Pagurus albidianthus de Saint Laurent & McLaughlin, 2000
Pagurus albus (Benedict, 1892)
Pagurus alcocki (Balss, 1911)
Pagurus aleuticus (Benedict, 1892)
Pagurus anachoretoides Forest, 1966
Pagurus anachoretus Risso, 1827
Pagurus angustus (Stimpson, 1858)
Pagurus annexus McLaughlin & Haig, 1993
Pagurus annulipes (Stimpson, 1860)
Pagurus arcuatus Squires, 1964
Pagurus arenisaxatilis Harvey & McLaughlin, 1991
Pagurus armatus (Dana, 1851)
Pagurus benedicti (Bouvier, 1892)
Pagurus beringanus (Benedict, 1892)
Pagurus bernhardus (Linnaeus, 1758)
Pagurus boletifer
Pagurus boriaustraliensis Morgan, 1990
Pagurus bouvieri (Faxon, 1895)
Pagurus brachiomastus (Thallwitz, 1892)
Pagurus brandti (Benedict, 1892)
Pagurus brevidactylus (Stimpson, 1859)
Pagurus brucei (Rathbun, 1926) †
Pagurus bullisi Wass, 1963
Pagurus capillatus (Benedict, 1892)
Pagurus capsularis McLaughlin, 1997
Pagurus carneus (Pocock, 1889)
Pagurus carolinensis McLaughlin, 1975
Pagurus carpoforminatus (Alcock, 1905)
Pagurus caurinus Hart, 1971
Pagurus cavicarpus (Paulson, 1875)
Pagurus chevreuxi (Bouvier, 1896)
Pagurus compressipes (Mieers, 1884)
Pagurus comptus White, 1847
Pagurus conformis (De Haan, 1849)
Pagurus confragosus (Benedict, 1892)
Pagurus confusus Komai & Yu, 1999
Pagurus constans (Stimpson, 1858)
Pagurus cornutus (Benedict, 1892)
Pagurus criniticornis (Dana, 1852)
Pagurus cuanensis Bell, 1845
Pagurus curacaoensis (Benedict, 1892)
Pagurus dalli (Benedict, 1892)
Pagurus dartevellei (Forest, 1958)
Pagurus decimbranchiae Komai & Osawa, 2001
Pagurus defensus (Benedict, 1892)
Pagurus delsolari Haig, 1974
Pagurus dissimilis (A. Milne-Edwards & Bouvier, 1893)
Pagurus edwardsii (Dana, 1852)
Pagurus emmersoni McLaughlin & Forest, 1999
Pagurus erythrogrammus Komai, 2003
Pagurus excavatus (Herbst, 1791)
Pagurus exiguus (Melin, 1939)
Pagurus exilis (Benedict, 1892)
Pagurus filholi (De Man, 1887)
Pagurus fimbriatus Forest, 1966
Pagurus forbesii Bell, 1845
Pagurus forceps H. Milne-Edwards, 1836
Pagurus fungiformis Komai & Rahayu, 2004
Pagurus gladius (Benedict, 1892)
Pagurus gordonae (Forest, 1956)
Pagurus gracilipes (Stimpson, 1858)
Pagurus granosimanus (Stimpson, 1859)
Pagurus gymnodactylus Lemaitre, 1982
Pagurus hartae (McLaughlin & Jensen, 1996)
Pagurus heblingi Nucci & Melo, 2003
Pagurus hedleyi (Grant & McCulloch, 1906)
Pagurus hemphilli (Benedict, 1892)
Pagurus hirsutiusculus (Dana, 1851)
Pagurus holmi Ng & McLaughlin, 2009
Pagurus ikedai Lemaitre & Watabe, 2005
Pagurus imafukui McLaughlin & Konishi, 1994
Pagurus imaii (Yokoya, 1939)
Pagurus imarpe Haig, 1974
Pagurus impressus (Benedict, 1892)
Pagurus indicus Sarojini & Nagabhushanam, 1972
Pagurus insulae Asakura, 1991
Pagurus investigatoris (Alcock, 1905)
Pagurus iridocarpus de Saint Laurent & McLaughlin, 2000
Pagurus irregularis (A. Milne-Edwards & Bouvier, 1892)
Pagurus japonicus (Stimpson, 1858)
Pagurus kaiensis McLaughlin, 1997
Pagurus kennerlyi (Stimpson, 1854)
Pagurus kulkarnii Sankolli, 1962
Pagurus lanuginosus De Haan, 1849
Pagurus laurentae Forest, 1978
Pagurus lepidus (Bouvier, 1898)
Pagurus leptonyx Forest & de Saint Laurent, 1968
Pagurus limatulus Fausto Filho, 1970
Pagurus liochele (Barnard, 1947)
Pagurus longicarpus Say, 1817
Pagurus longimanus Wass, 1963
Pagurus lophochela Komai, 1999
Pagurus luticola Komai & Chan, 2006
Pagurus macardlei (Alcock, 1905)
Pagurus maclaughlinae Garcia-Gomez, 1982
Pagurus maculosus Komai & Imafuku, 1996
Pagurus malloryi Schweitzer & Feldmann, 2001 †
Pagurus marshi Benedict, 1901
Pagurus mbizi (Forest, 1955)
Pagurus meloi Lemaitre & Cruz Castano, 2004
Pagurus mertensii Brandt, 1851
Pagurus middendorffii Brandt, 1851
Pagurus minutus Hess, 1865
Pagurus moluccensis Haig & Ball, 1988
Pagurus nanodes Haig & Harvey, 1991
Pagurus nesiotes Haig & McLaughlin, 1991
Pagurus nigrivittatus Komai, 2003
Pagurus nigrofascia Komai, 1996
Pagurus nipponensis (Yokoya, 1933)
Pagurus nisari Siddiqui & Komai, 2008
Pagurus novizealandiae (Dana, 1852)
Pagurus ochotensis Brandt, 1851
Pagurus parvispina Komai, 1997
Pagurus parvus (Benedict, 1892)
Pagurus pectinatus (Stimpson, 1858)
Pagurus pergranulatus (Henderson, 1896)
Pagurus perlatus H. Milne-Edwards, 1848
Pagurus pilosipes (Stimpson, 1858)
Pagurus pilsbryi Roberts, 1962 †
Pagurus pitagsaleei McLaughlin, 2002
Pagurus politus (Smith, 1882)
Pagurus pollicaris Say, 1817
Pagurus prideaux Leach, 1815
Pagurus protuberocarpus McLaughlin, 1982
Pagurus provenzanoi Forest & de Saint Laurent, 1968
Pagurus proximus Komai, 2000
Pagurus pubescens Krøyer, 1838
Pagurus pubescentulus (A. Milne-Edwards & Bouvier, 1892)
Pagurus pulchellus (A. Milne-Edwards & Bouvier, 1892)
Pagurus pycnacanthus (Forest, 1955)
Pagurus quaylei Hart, 1971
Pagurus quinquelineatus Komai, 2003
Pagurus rathbuni (Benedict, 1892)
Pagurus redondoensis Wicksten, 1982
Pagurus retrorsimanus Wicksten & McLaughlin, 1998
Pagurus rhabdotus Haig & Harvey, 1991
Pagurus rotundimanus Wass, 1963
Pagurus ruber (A. Milne-Edwards & Bouvier, 1892)
Pagurus rubrior Komai, 2003
Pagurus samoensis (Ortmann, 1892)
Pagurus samuelis (Stimpson, 1857)
Pagurus setosus (Benedict, 1892)
Pagurus similimanus (Balss, 1921)
Pagurus similis (Ortmann, 1892)
Pagurus simulans Komai, 2000
Pagurus sinuatus (Stimpson, 1858)
Pagurus smithi (Benedict, 1892)
Pagurus souriei (Forest, 1952)
Pagurus spighti McLaughlin & Haig, 1993
Pagurus spilocarpus Haig, 1977
Pagurus spina Komai, 1994
Pagurus spinulentus (Henderson, 1888)
Pagurus stevensae Hart, 1971
Pagurus sticticus McLaughlin, 2008
Pagurus stimpsoni (A. Milne-Edwards & Bouvier, 1893)
Pagurus tanneri (Benedict, 1892)
Pagurus townsendi (Benedict, 1892)
Pagurus traversi (Filhol, 1885)
Pagurus triangularis (Chevreux & Bouvier, 1892)
Pagurus trichocerus Forest & de Saint Laurent, 1968
Pagurus trigonocheirus (Stimpson, 1858)
Pagurus tristanensis (Henderson, 1888)
Pagurus tuberculosus Harvey, 1998 †
Pagurus undosus (Benedict, 1892)
Pagurus venturensis Coffin, 1957
Pagurus vetaultae Harvey & McLaughlin, 1991
Pagurus villosus Nicolet, 1849
Pagurus virgulatus Haig & Harvey, 1991

The following are all nomina nuda. They have never been validly described as new species, but only mentioned under these names:
Pagurus bunomanus Glassell, 1937
Pagurus crenatus Hope, 1851
Pagurus cuanensis Thompson, 1844
Pagurus cultratus White, 1847
Pagurus hirtimanus White, 1847
Pagurus hyndmani Thompson, 1844
Pagurus laevis Thompson, 1844
Pagurus ulidiae Thompson, 1843

References

Hermit crabs